Huai Sieo railway station is a railway station located in Nam Phong Subdistrict, Nam Phong District, Khon Kaen Province.

References 

Railway stations in Thailand
Khon Kaen province